Magdalene Sibylle of Saxe-Weissenfels (3 September 1673 – 28 November 1726), was a German noblewoman member of the House of Wettin (Albertine line) and by marriage Duchess of Saxe-Eisenach.

Born in Halle, she was the oldest daughter and first child of Duke Johann Adolf I of Saxe-Weissenfels and his wife Johanna Magdalena, the daughter of Duke Frederick William II of Saxe-Altenburg.  She was named after her paternal great-grandmother, Duchess Magdalene Sibylle of Prussia.

Life
In Weissenfels on 28 July 1708, Magdalene Sibylle married John William III, Duke of Saxe-Eisenach as his third wife. They had three children, of whom only one survive adulthood:

Johanna Magdalene Sophie (Eisenach, 19 August 1710 - Eisenach, 26 February 1711).
Christiane Wilhelmine (Altenkirchen, 3 September 1711 - Idstein, 27 November 1740), married on 26 November 1734 to Charles, Prince of Nassau-Usingen.
John William (Marksuhl, 28 January 1713 - Eisenach, 8 May 1713).

She died in Eisenach aged 53 and was buried in the Georgenkirche, Eisenach.

Notes

External links

Johann Hübner: ... Drey hundert und drey und dreyßig Genealogische Tabellen, table 169

 

 

House of Saxe-Weissenfels
House of Wettin
German duchesses
1673 births
1726 deaths
17th-century German people
18th-century German people
Duchesses of Saxe-Eisenach
Albertine branch
Daughters of monarchs